This article contains lists of achievements in major international figure skating competitions according to first-place, second-place and third-place results obtained by skaters/teams representing different nations. The objective is not to create combined medal tables; the focus is on listing the best positions achieved by skaters/teams in major international competitions, ranking the nations according to the most number of podiums accomplished by skaters/teams of these nations. All five competitive disciplines currently recognized by the International Skating Union (ISU) are covered: 1) Men's single skating, 2) Ladies' single skating, 3) Pair skating, 4) Ice dance, and 5) Synchronized skating. The four disciplines of men's singles, ladies' singles, pair skating and ice dance also appeared as part of a team event at the Winter Olympic Games.

Results

From major senior events 
For the making of these lists, results from following major international competitions were consulted:

 IOC: International Olympic Committee
 ISU: International Skating Union
 Note: Men's special figures which is not a competitive discipline currently recognized by the ISU was discontinued after a single Olympics, and the results of men's special figures achieved in the 1908 Olympic Games were not considered.

Medals earned by athletes from defunct National Olympic Committees (NOCs) or historical teams are NOT merged with the results achieved by their immediate successor states. The International Olympic Committee (IOC) does NOT combine medals of these nations or teams.

The conventions used on this table are M for individual Men's single skating event, L for individual Ladies' single skating event, P for individual Pair skating event, D for individual ice Dance event, T for Team event, S for Synchronized skating event, WTT for World Team Trophy, WSSC for World Synchronized Skating Championships.

The table is pre-sorted by total number of first-place results, second-place results and third-place results, respectively. When equal ranks are given, nations are listed in alphabetical order.

All competitive disciplines 

*Defunct National Olympic Committees (NOCs) or historical teams are shown in italic.

Men's single skating 

*Defunct National Olympic Committees (NOCs) or historical teams are shown in italic.

Ladies' single skating 

*Defunct National Olympic Committees (NOCs) or historical teams are shown in italic.

Pair skating 

*Defunct National Olympic Committees (NOCs) or historical teams are shown in italic.

Ice dance 

*Defunct National Olympic Committees (NOCs) or historical teams are shown in italic.

Team event 

*Defunct National Olympic Committees (NOCs) or historical teams are shown in italic.

Synchronized skating

From major youth and junior events 
For the making of these lists, results from following major international competitions were consulted:

 IOC: International Olympic Committee
 ISU: International Skating Union
 Note: Results achieved in Mixed-NOCs team events at the Youth Olympic Games were not considered.

Medals earned by athletes from defunct National Olympic Committees (NOCs) or historical teams are NOT merged with the results achieved by their immediate successor states. The International Olympic Committee (IOC) does NOT combine medals of these nations or teams.

The conventions used on this table are M for individual Men's single skating event, L for individual Ladies' single skating event, P for individual Pair skating event, D for individual ice Dance event, S for Synchronized skating event, WJSSC for World Junior Synchronized Skating Championships, and JWCC for Synchronized Skating Junior World Challenge Cup.

The table is pre-sorted by total number of first-place results, second-place results and third-place results, respectively. When equal ranks are given, nations are listed in alphabetical order.

All competitive disciplines 

*Defunct National Olympic Committees (NOCs) or historical teams are shown in italic.

Men's single skating 

*Defunct National Olympic Committees (NOCs) or historical teams are shown in italic.

Ladies' single skating 

*Defunct National Olympic Committees (NOCs) or historical teams are shown in italic.

Pair skating 

*Defunct National Olympic Committees (NOCs) or historical teams are shown in italic.

Ice dance 

*Defunct National Olympic Committees (NOCs) or historical teams are shown in italic.

Synchronized skating

See also 

Major senior events
 Figure skating at the Olympic Games
 List of Olympic medalists in figure skating
 List of Olympic medalists in figure skating by age
 ISU World Figure Skating Championships
 World Figure Skating Championships cumulative medal count
 ISU European Figure Skating Championships
 All-time European Figure Skating Championships medal table
 ISU Four Continents Figure Skating Championships
 Four Continents Figure Skating Championships cumulative medal count
 ISU Grand Prix of Figure Skating Final
 ISU Challenger Series
 ISU World Team Trophy in Figure Skating
 ISU World Synchronized Skating Championships

Major youth and junior events
 Figure skating at the Youth Olympic Games
 ISU World Junior Figure Skating Championships
 ISU Junior Grand Prix of Figure Skating Final
 ISU World Junior Synchronized Skating Championships
 ISU Junior World Challenge Cup

Others
 ISU World Standings and Season's World Ranking
 List of highest ranked figure skaters by nation
 List of ISU World Standings and Season's World Ranking statistics
 Grand Slam (figure skating)
 Figure skating records and statistics
 List of major achievements in sports by nation

References

General 

Major senior events - official results
 ISU – Olympic Games Figure Skating:
 1908–2002 Men Ladies Pairs Ice dance
 2006 2010 2014 2018
 ISU World Figure Skating Championships:
 1896–2003 Men Ladies Pairs Ice dance
 2004 2005 2006 2007 2008 2009 2010 2011 2012 2013 2014 2015 2016 2017 2018 2019
 ISU European Figure Skating Championships:
 1891–2004 Men Ladies Pairs Ice dance
 2005 2006 2007 2008 2009 2010 2011 2012 2013 2014 2015 2016 2017 2018 2019
 ISU Four Continents Figure Skating Championships:
 1999–2003 Men Ladies Pairs Ice dance
 2004 2005 2006 2007 2008 2009 2010 2011 2012 2013 2014 2015 2016 2017 2018 2019
 ISU Grand Prix of Figure Skating Final:
 1999–2000 2000–01 2001–02 2002–03 2003–04 2004–05 2005–06 2006–07 2007–08 2008–09 2009–10 2010–11 2011–12 2012–13 2013–14 2014–15 2015–16 2016–17 2017–18 2018–19
 ISU World Team Trophy in Figure Skating:
 2009 2012 2013 2015 2017

Major youth and junior events - official results
 ISU – Youth Olympic Games Figure Skating:
 2012 2016
 ISU World Junior Figure Skating Championships:
 1976–2007 Men Ladies Pairs Ice dance
 2008 2009 2010 2011 2012 2013 2014 2015 2016 2017 2018 2019
 ISU Junior Grand Prix of Figure Skating Final:
 1999–2000 2000–01 2001–02 2002–03 2003–04 2004–05 2005–06 2006–07 2007–08 2008–09 2009–10 2010–11 2011–12 2012–13 2013–14 2014–15 2015–16 2016–17 2017–18 2018–19

Specific

External links 
 International Skating Union

Figure skating
Achievements
Achievements